St. Thomas College, Kozhencherry is a government-aided college in Kozhencherry, Kerala state, South India. Established in 1953, it is administered by the Mar Thoma Syrian Church. Juhanon Mar Thoma Metropolitan and K. T. Thomas, Kurumthottickal, the veteran Minister of the Parish of Kozhencherry were involved in founding the college. Joseph Mar Thoma Metropolitan, the present head of the Mar Thoma Church, is the manager of the college.

K. K. Kuruvilla (grandfather of the writer Meena Alexander), first principal of Mar Thoma Theological Seminary, Gandhian and a pioneer of the freedom struggle in Travancore, was an influential member of the Travancore Legislative Council. He initiated fruitful efforts on behalf of the Mar Thoma Church in securing a license for the establishment of two colleges (Mar Thoma College, Thiruvalla and St. Thomas College, Kozhencherry) in central Travancore from C. P. Ramaswami Iyer, the then 'Dewan' (Chief minister) of Travancore.

The college accommodates students hailing from the remote regions of the eastern part of Pathanamthitta District.

The college has been awarded 'Rajamudra', a rare honor, from the erstwhile Travancore Royal Family, for the academic progress which it brought about in the Central Travancore region.

The college celebrated its Diamond Jubilee in 2013.

It jubilantly hosted Mahatma Gandhi University Union Kalolsavam (Arts Fest) "Noopura-2017", from Feb.20-24.

Academics
The college offers postgraduate and undergraduate programmes in English, Malayalam, economics, mathematics, physics, chemistry, botany, zoology, commerce and computer science (SF) and undergraduate in Hindi, history, BBA (SF) and B.Com. (SF).

The college is re-accredited by the National Assessment and Accreditation Council, an autonomous agency of the UGC, with A Grade. When the college was established in 1953, it was affiliated to the Travancore University and later to the University of Kerala. Since 1983, it has been affiliated to the Mahatma Gandhi University, Kottayam.

Principals
 Mathew P John 2019
 K. C. Zachariah 2016 – 2019
 Roys P.David Mallassery 2013–2016
 Alexander K. Samuel 2009–2013
 Joseph Philip 2008–2009
 K.George Abraham 2006–2008
 Mathew Daniel 2003–2006
 P.J Philip 1999–2003
 Philip Varghese 1997–1999
 N. Samuel Thomas 1995–1997
 M.T Simon 1990–1995
 O.A Cherian 1979–1990
 K.V Varghese 1971–1979
 K.G George 1966–1971
 A.J Cherian 1953–1966

Notable alumni
 George Alexander Muthoot, businessman

See also
 Poomaram

External links

Christian universities and colleges in India
Arts and Science colleges in Kerala
Colleges affiliated to Mahatma Gandhi University, Kerala
Universities and colleges in Pathanamthitta district
Educational institutions established in 1953
1953 establishments in India